Scott Yanow (born October 4, 1954) is an American jazz reviewer, historian, and author.

Biography
Yanow was born in New York City and grew up near Los Angeles.

Since 1974, he was a regular reviewer of many jazz styles and was the jazz editor for Record Review. He wrote for many jazz and arts magazines, including JazzTimes, Jazziz, Down Beat, Cadence, CODA and the Los Angeles Jazz Scene. In September 2002, Yanow was interviewed on-camera by CNN about the Monterey Jazz Festival and wrote an in-depth biography on Dizzy Gillespie for AllMusic.com. He authored 12 books on jazz (including 2022's Life Through The Eyes Of A Jazz Journalist), over 900 liner notes for CDs and over 20,000 reviews of jazz recordings.

Yanow was a contributor to and co-editor of the third edition of the All Music Guide to Jazz. He continues to write for Downbeat, Jazziz, the Los Angeles Jazz Scene, "Syncopated Times," "Jazz Artistry Now," the Jazz Rag and New York City Jazz Record.

Yanow has produced a series of CDs for the Allegro record label. He also hosted a regular radio show (Jazz After Hours) for KCSN-FM, and worked as the jazz listings editor for the Los Angeles Times.

Bibliography
Books
 Duke Ellington (November 1999) 
 Swing (April 2000) 
 Bebop (August 2000) 
 Afro-Cuban Jazz (December 2000) 
 Trumpet Kings: The Players Who Shaped the Sound of Jazz Trumpet (August 2001) 
 Classic Jazz (December 2001) 
 Jazz on Film, The Complete History of the Musicians and Music Onscreen (October 2004) 
 Jazz on Record – The First Sixty Years (October 2003) 
 Jazz: A Regional Exploration (February 28, 2005) 
 The Jazz Singers: The Ultimate Guide (September 2008) 
 The Great Jazz Guitarists: The Ultimate Guide (April 2013) 
  Life Through The Eyes Of A Jazz Journalist - My Music Memoirs (April 2022) 

Contributions to magazines
 Cadence Coda Down Beat Jazz Forum Jazz Improv JAZZIZ Jazz News Jazz Now Jazz Times Planet Jazz Record Review The Los Angeles Jazz Scene The Mississippi Rag The Jazz Report''

Contributions to record labels
 Allegro
 Arbors Records
 Brownstone
 Collectors Classics
 Candid Records
 Challenge Records
 Concord Records
 Enja
 Evidence Music
 Fuel 2000
 Good Time Jazz Records
 Jazzed Media
 Naxos Records
 Pablo Records
 Reservoir Records
 Soundies
 Starline
 Storyville Records
 Victor Entertainment
 V.S.O.P.
 Woofy

References

External links
 Scott Yanow's official site
 Scott Yanow's Page at the Jazz Network Worldwide.

AllMusic
Living people
American music journalists
Jazz writers
Writers from California
1954 births
Writers from New York (state)
Discographers